Sean Boudreau Bedford (born December 26, 1987) is a former American football center. Bedford played one season as the starting center for Rivas Osos, a Spanish football team in the Liga Nacional de Fútbol Americano from 2010–2011. He started his college football career at Georgia Tech as a walk-on and went on to win the very first Burlsworth Trophy.

College career
Bedford walked on to Georgia Tech in 2006 without any Division I scholarship offers to play football. Bedford would redshirt in 2006, serve as a member of the scout team in 2007 and worked his way up to being the primary center backup in 2008.

Bedford was awarded a scholarship from head coach Paul Johnson following spring practice in 2009. He grabbed the starting job at center in spring practice and went on to start all 14 games in 2009 on the way to being named first team All-ACC.

In 2010, Bedford was named the first-ever recipient of the Burlsworth Trophy, given to the top player in Division I FBS who began their career as a walk-on.

Bedford majored in Aerospace Engineering at Georgia Tech. In 2010, he was named one of the 20 smartest athlete in sports by Sporting News. In 2013, he was named to CBS Sports' All-Walk-On Team and included in the 25 Greatest Walk-Ons of the BCS Era by Bleacher Report.

Professional career
Coming out of college, Bedford was signed for the 2011 season by Rivas Osos, a semi-pro team in Spain, to play the LNFA.

Post-football career
After returning to the United States from Spain, Bedford attended the University of Florida Levin College of Law and graduated in 2014. He is now an associate with the international intellectual property law firm of Alston & Bird and is the color commentator for the IMG Radio Network Georgia Tech football broadcasts.

References

External links
 http://www.ajc.com/sports/georgia-tech/techs-bedford-takes-his-829559.html

1987 births
Living people
American football centers
Georgia Tech Yellow Jackets football players
Players of American football from Gainesville, Florida